National Centre for Promotion of Employment for Disabled People is trust established in 1996. The organization's philosophy is that society needs to change traditionally held views of "charity and welfare to those of productivity and empowerment of disabled people". Its first director was Javed Abidi. 

National Centre for Promotion of Employment for Disabled People (NCPEDP) is a cross-disability, non-profit organization, working as an interface between the government, industry, international agencies, and the voluntary sector towards empowerment of persons with disabilities. 

Vision
A society where people with disabilities are equal members leading dignified lives through economic independence.

Mission
To promote equality for people with disabilities in all spheres of life through research and advocacy around- Employment, Education, Accessibility, Communication.

By putting the rights of people with disabilities at the heart of everything we do, NCPEDP aims to empower people with disabilities through appropriate legislation, encouraging employment of people with disabilities, creating awareness on disability issues, and promoting accessibility in public spaces, products, services and technologies.

NCPEDP has a pan India presence through the National Disability Network (NDN). Formed in 1999, NDN has members from the majority of States and Union Territories of the country.

NCPEDP has also constituted the National Committee on the Rights of Persons with Disabilities (NCRPD) consisting of disability sector leaders and experts from across the country, that meet at regular intervals to discuss ongoing pertinent issues concerning people with disabilities and to plan a viable strategy to address their issues.

For the last 25 years, NCPEDP has been advocating for viewing the issues of disabled people with a rights-based approach and equality and gender-based lens; subsequently moving away from traditionally held views of charity and welfare. Since 1996, NCPEDP has successfully advocated for several policies that have positively impacted the lives of thousands of people with disabilities.
Instagram | Twitter | LinkedIn

References
National Centre for Promotion of Employment for Disabled People website

Disability organisations based in India
1996 establishments in Delhi